Public Gas Corporation of Greece A.E. (DEPA) commonly known for its Greek abbreviation DEPA is the natural gas supply company of Greece. The registered office of the company is based in Irakleio,  Attica. It operates within the jurisdiction of the Ministry of Development. The current chairman is Ioannis Papadopoulos while Konstantinos Xifaras serves as CEO.  In 2005, in order to liberalise the natural gas market, DESFA was created as a fully owned subsidiary to transport natural gas within Greece.  Since then, DEPA sells gas to large consumers and to the gas supply companies.  Natural gas is imported by pipelines from Bulgaria and Turkey and by liquefied natural gas at the Revithoussa LNG Terminal.

In May 2018 it was announced to sell DEPA's subsidiaries in Thessaly and Thessaloniki to Italian company Eni. It was reported that DEPA would only keep the gas operations in Attica area.

In 2019, the privatization of DEPA was approved by the Greek Government, and the company was split into three separate entities: DEPA Infrastructure, DEPA International Projects and DEPA Commercial.

Splitting and Privatisation 

DEPA was split in 2019 into three separate entities:

DEPA Infrastructure: Includes DEPA's shareholding in the management companies of the gas distribution networks in Greece, the fixed assets of the distribution networks, the fiber optic network owned by DEPA and the rights and obligations of DEPA in natural gas distribution networks (compressed or liquefied), in addition to its participation in international projects.
DEPA International Projects: Includes DEPA's participations in international projects.
DEPA Commercial: Mainly deals with the import and supply of natural gas and electricity, as well as possible rights and obligations of DEPA in international projects (e.g. quantity commitments in transnational pipelines).

The HRADF, which before the split owned 65% of DEPA shares (the remaining 35% belonging to Hellenic Petroleum), will proceed with the privatisation of only DEPA Infrastructure and DEPA Commercial (HRADF holds 65% of each company's shares, with 35% of the remaining shares in each company being held by Hellenic Petroleum). The only exception is DEPA International Projects, where the HRADF will transfer its 65% shareholding to the Greek State.

On 10 December 2021, Italgas signed the sale and purchase agreement for the acquisition of 100% of DEPA Infrastructure.

Subsidiaries 

 ΕDA Attikis A.E. (51%)
 EDA Thess A.E. (51%)

See also

 Energy in Greece

References

External links 

Oil and gas companies of Greece
Privatization in Greece
1988 establishments in Greece
Companies established in 1988
Government-owned companies of Greece
Greek brands